Jaroslav Jurka (born 8 July 1949) is a Czech fencer. He competed at the 1976 and 1980 Summer Olympics.

References

External links
 

1949 births
Living people
Czech male fencers
Czechoslovak male fencers
Olympic fencers of Czechoslovakia
Fencers at the 1976 Summer Olympics
Fencers at the 1980 Summer Olympics
Sportspeople from Olomouc